Folkestone and Hythe is a constituency in Kent represented in the House of Commons of the UK Parliament since 2010 by Damian Collins, a Conservative.

Since its creation in 1950, Folkestone and Hythe has elected a Conservative MP at every general election; it is therefore regarded as a Conservative safe seat.

Constituency profile
Folkestone and Hythe consists of a hilly swathe of East Kent including the coastal towns of Folkestone and Hythe, in the south east of England. An urban area exists in and small suburban area around Folkestone and Hythe. The rural communities of New Romney, Lydd, Dymchurch, Lyminge and Elham contain significant farming communities, commuters to towns and business parks, including a small percentage to London and a large retired population.

Boundaries 

1950–1983: The Municipal Boroughs of Folkestone, Hythe, Lydd, and New Romney, and the Rural Districts of Elham and Romney Marsh.

1983–2010: The District of Shepway.

2010–present: The District of Shepway (the District of Folkestone and Hythe from 2018), and the Borough of Ashford ward of Saxon Shore.

Members of Parliament 
The current Member of Parliament is Damian Collins of the Conservative Party who was elected at the 2010 general election. Collins' predecessor for the seat was Michael Howard (served 1983–2010). Howard held a number of political posts during his career in Parliament, most prominently as Home Secretary from 1993 to 1997 and Leader of the Conservative Party from 2003 to 2005.

Elections

Elections in the 2010s

Elections in the 2000s

Elections in the 1990s

Elections in the 1980s

Elections in the 1970s

Elections in the 1960s

Elections in the 1950s

See also 
 List of parliamentary constituencies in Kent

Notes

References

Sources
Election result, 2005 (BBC)
Election results 1997-2001 (BBC)
Election results 1997-2001 (Election Demon)
Election results 1992-2010 (The Guardian)

Folkestone and Hythe District
Parliamentary constituencies in Kent
Constituencies of the Parliament of the United Kingdom established in 1950